Josef "Joe" Viera (born 4 September 1932) is a German jazz saxophonist and educator.

Viera worked with the Riverboat Seven, and Albert Mangelsdorff early in his career, and led a trio which played free jazz in the late 1960s. He taught at the University of Duisburg-Essen from 1971 to 1998, taking a professorship there in 1981, and has also taught at the Musikhochschule Hannover, University of Munich, and University of Passau. He has also published jazz method books and organized jazz workshops in Germany and elsewhere in Europe. He was the founder and musical director of the Internationale Jazzwoche Burghausen.

References

German jazz saxophonists
Male saxophonists
German male jazz musicians
1932 births
Living people